A Quiet Place is a series of American horror films written, produced and directed by John Krasinski. Consisting of two films, the series is set in an apocalyptic world inhabited by blind extraterrestrial monsters with an acute sense of hearing. Beginning with the 2018 film A Quiet Place, the franchise was expanded upon in the 2021 sequel A Quiet Place Part II.

The franchise will continue with A Quiet Place Part III, a spin-off/prequel film titled A Quiet Place: Day One, and a video game set within the same fictional universe currently in development.

Films

A Quiet Place (2018)

A Quiet Place is a 2018 American horror film directed by and starring John Krasinski. Written by Bryan Woods, Scott Beck and Krasinski, the plot revolves around a father (Krasinski) and a mother (Emily Blunt) who struggle to survive and raise their children in a post-apocalyptic world inhabited by blind monsters with an acute sense of hearing. Krasinski and Blunt were cast in the lead roles in May 2017. Filming took place in upstate New York from May to November 2017.

A Quiet Place premiered at South by Southwest on March 9, 2018, and was released in the United States on April 6, 2018, by Paramount Pictures. It grossed over $340 million worldwide, and received critical acclaim for its atmosphere, direction, acting, and sound design. It was described as a "smart, wickedly frightening good time", and chosen by both the National Board of Review and American Film Institute as one of the top ten films of 2018.

A Quiet Place Part II (2021)

A Quiet Place Part II is the sequel to A Quiet Place. The sequel film was written and directed by John Krasinski and stars Emily Blunt, Millicent Simmonds, and Noah Jupe, who reprise their roles from the first film. Cillian Murphy and Djimon Hounsou also joined the cast. In June 2019, production began on the sequel.

The change to April 2021 was the studio's second postponement. The film was then delayed to September 17, 2021, and later moved up to its final release date of May 28, 2021.

Future

A Quiet Place: Day One (2024)

In November 2020, it was announced that a spin-off film was in development, with Jeff Nichols set to serve as writer/director, based on an original idea from John Krasinski. Krasinski will serve as producer, alongside Michael Bay, Andrew Form, and Brad Fuller. The project will be a joint-venture production between Paramount Pictures, Sunday Night Productions, and Platinum Dunes. In May 2021, Krasinski announced that the script is complete and submitted to the studio. By October of the same year however, Nichols stepped down as director citing creative differences ; while the studio was stated to be quickly looking for a replacement. In January 2022, Michael Sarnoski signed on as director in addition to contributing to the script. In April 2022 at CinemaCon, the film's title was officially announced as, A Quiet Place: Day One. Principal photography commenced on January 2, 2023, in London, England.

The film is scheduled for release on March 8, 2024.

A Quiet Place Part III (2025)
In May 2021, Emily Blunt revealed that her husband John Krasinski (who serves as co-star, co-writer, director, and co-producer for the series), has plans for a third A Quiet Place film. Acknowledging that he had wanted to see how the second installment was received before moving forward on the next film, she stated it is intended to be a trilogy. In July 2021, Blunt confirmed that Krasinski is working on a third installment, separate from the spin-off movie, with intentions to once again serve as director. In February 2022, A Quiet Place Part III was officially announced with a scheduled release date in 2025.

Production

A Quiet Place
Beck and Woods began writing A Quiet Place in January 2016, and Krasinski read their initial script the following July. The concept appealed to Krasinski of parents protecting their children, especially as his second child with actress Emily Blunt had just been born, and Blunt encouraged him to direct the film. By March 2017, Paramount had bought Beck and Woods's script, and they hired Krasinski to rewrite the script and direct the film, which was his third directorial credit and his first for a major studio. Blunt did not want to be cast in the film, but she read the script on a plane flight and immediately told her husband, "I need to do it." He agreed, and they were both cast in the starring roles. After considering developing the film as a potential fourth instalment in the Cloverfield franchise, Paramount and Krasinski decided that it would work better as a standalone film capable of forming an independent franchise.

Production took place from May to November 2017 in Dutchess and Ulster counties in upstate New York. During filming, the crew avoided making noise so diegetic synchronized sounds (e.g., the sound of rolling dice on a game board) could be recorded; the sounds were amplified in post-production. A traditional musical score was also added, which Krasinski justified in wanting audiences to remain familiar with watching a mainstream film, and not feel like part of a "silence experiment." In the film, creatures are blind and communicate through clicking sounds. Aadahl and Van der Ryn said they were inspired by animal echolocation, such as that employed by bats. The sound of feedback, normally avoided by sound editors, was woven into the story at a loudness level that would not bother audiences too much.

The characters communicate in American Sign Language (ASL) to avoid making sound, so the filmmakers hired deaf mentor Douglas Ridloff to teach ASL to the actors and to be available to make corrections. They also hired an ASL interpreter for deaf actress Simmonds, so that spoken and signed language could be interpreted back and forth on set. Simmonds grew up with ASL, and she helped teach her fellow actors to sign. She said, "In the movie, we've been signing together for years and years. So it should look fluent." She observed that each character's use of sign language reflected his or her motivations: the father had short and brief signs which showed his survival mentality, while the mother had more expressive signs as part of wanting her children to experience more than survival. Krasinski said that Simmonds's character used "signing that's very defiant, it's very teenage defiant."

Producers Andrew Form and Bradley Fuller said that they initially planned not to provide on-screen subtitles for sign-language dialogue while providing only "context clues," but they realized that subtitles were necessary for the scene in which the deaf daughter and her hearing father argue about the modified hearing aid. They subsequently added subtitles for all sign-language dialogue in the film.

A Quiet Place Part II
In April 2018, Paramount Chair and CEO Jim Gianopulos announced that a sequel was in development. John Krasinski, who co-wrote, directed and starred in the first film, said he considered it "as a one-off". Uncertain of finding similar success in a sequel, he initially told Paramount to seek another writer and director. The first film's screenwriters Scott Beck and Bryan Woods did not return for the sequel. Woods said they were not interested in a franchise approach and that they would rather try "to create original ideas" and use their writing credits "as an opportunity to push several projects". Beck said, "Instead of focusing on sequels per se, it's about investing back into the ecosystem of original ideas in a massive marketplace."

According to Krasinski, Paramount rejected pitches from other writers and directors that were considered too franchise-oriented. He said, "I had this small idea, which was to make Millie [Simmonds] the lead of the movie... her character opens the door to all the themes I was dealing with in the first movie." The studio invited him to write a script based on his idea. By August 2018, Krasinski was writing the film. In the following February, he was hired to direct the sequel, and actors Emily Blunt, Millicent Simmonds, and Noah Jupe were confirmed to reprise their roles. In March, Cillian Murphy joined the cast. In the following June, Brian Tyree Henry joined the cast, but he left the film due to scheduling problems. He was replaced by Djimon Hounsou in August.

In June 2019, production began on the sequel.

Cast and characters

Additional crew and production details

Reception

Box office performance

Critical response

Accolades

In other media
In October 2021, it was announced that a video game set within the same continuity as the film series is in development. The game will reportedly include an untold original story. The developers stated: "The A Quiet Place video game will let fans experience the tension of the films with a level of immersion they’ve never felt before." The project which will be published by Saber Interactive, is being created in collaboration by iLLOGIKA, EP1T0ME Studios Inc., and Paramount Pictures Corporation.

References

 
American film series
American monster movies
American science fiction horror films
American Sign Language films
English-language films
Film series introduced in 2018
Films about deaf people
Films directed by John Krasinski
Films produced by Andrew Form
Films produced by Bradley Fuller
Films produced by Michael Bay
Horror film series
Paramount Pictures franchises
Platinum Dunes films